Alto is a town in Banks and Habersham counties in the U.S. state of Georgia. As of the 2010 census, the town had a population of 1,172, up from 876 at the 2000 census.

History
Alto was so named on account of its (relatively) lofty elevation (1,394 feet above mean sea level). A post office called Alto has been in operation since 1879. The town incorporated in 1895.

Geography
Alto is located at  (34.466531, -83.573820).

Demographics

As of the census of 2000, there were 876 people, 304 households, and 227 families residing in the town. The racial makeup of the town was 79.22% White, 3.08% African American, 0.34% Native American, 5.94% Asian, 9.02% from other races, and 2.40% from two or more races. Hispanic or Latino of any race were 20.09% of the population.

There were 304 households, out of which 37.5% had children under the age of 18 living with them, 58.2% were married couples living together, 8.9% had a female householder with no husband present, and 25.3% were non-families. 21.7% of all households were made up of individuals, and 6.6% had someone living alone who was 65 years of age or older.  The average household size was 2.88 and the average family size was 3.35.

In the town, the population was spread out, with 29.3% under the age of 18, 12.8% from 18 to 24, 32.0% from 25 to 44, 18.5% from 45 to 64, and 7.4% who were 65 years of age or older.  The median age was 30 years. For every 100 females there were 106.6 males.  For every 100 females age 18 and over, there were 103.0 males.

The median income for a household in the town was $30,750, and the median income for a family was $36,094. Males had a median income of $23,393 versus $18,571 for females. The per capita income for the town was $11,434.  Below the poverty line were 15.6% of people, 11.2% of families, 12.2% of those under 18 and 15.6% of those over 64.

Government and infrastructure
The government for the town of Alto is housed in a structure with an unusual history.  When the new Cornelia Bank was built in nearby Cornelia in the late 1970s, the small building housing the old remote drive-in teller windows was moved to its current location on a lot across Georgia Hwy 441 from the Riegel Textile Mill (now Mt. Vernon Mills) in Alto and converted for office use.

The Georgia Department of Corrections operates the Arrendale State Prison in unincorporated Habersham County, near Alto.

References

Towns in Banks County, Georgia
Towns in Habersham County, Georgia
Towns in Georgia (U.S. state)